Ludowy Zespół Sportowy Czarni Wierzchosławice is a football club from Wierzchosławice, Poland. It was founded in 1953. The club currently plays in Liga Okręgowa (VI level).Najwyższa liga V

References
 info about club on 90minut.pl

Association football clubs established in 1953
1953 establishments in Poland
Football clubs in Kuyavian-Pomeranian Voivodeship
Inowrocław County